The Victor Cullen School Power House is a historic power house building located at Sabillasville, Frederick County, Maryland. It is a -story, Renaissance Revival stone structure, with a hip roof and a fully exposed basement. The building was built originally as part of the Maryland Tuberculosis Sanitorium, the first state sponsored institution of its type in Maryland. It was designed by architects Wyatt & Nolting.

The Victor Cullen School Power House was listed on the National Register of Historic Places in 1987.

See also
Victor Cullen Center, Old Administration Building, also NRHP-listed

References

External links
, including photo from 2006, at Maryland Historical Trust

Industrial buildings and structures on the National Register of Historic Places in Maryland
Buildings and structures in Frederick County, Maryland
Energy infrastructure completed in 1908
National Register of Historic Places in Frederick County, Maryland
1908 establishments in Maryland